Ivan Batur (born July 4, 1991) is a Croatian professional basketball player playing for Gorica of the Croatian League. He plays the shooting guard and small forward positions.

Playing career 
Batur grew up in KK Zadar. He was part of the Croatian national basketball team youth selections. With the national team he won two bronze medals at European youth championships. After winning his second medal in the summer of 2009 he signed his first professional contract with KK Zadar. In the summer of 2013, he renewed his contract. In June 2014, he left Zadar and in August 2014 joined KK Zagreb.

References

External links
 Ivan Batur at fibaeurope.com
 Ivan Batur at abaliga.com
 Ivan Batur at draftexpress.com
 Ivan Batur at basketball.eurobasket.com

1991 births
Living people
ABA League players
Croatian men's basketball players
KK Gorica players
KK Zadar players
KK Zagreb players
Shooting guards
Small forwards
Basketball players from Zadar
KK Zabok players
KK Škrljevo players